Bajcaridris is a genus of ants in the subfamily Formicinae. Its three species are known from northern Africa. B. theryi inhabits the meadows of the Atlas Mountains in Morocco, and B. kraussii and B. menozzii inhabit the wadis of the northern Sahara in Algeria.

Species
 Bajcaridris kraussii (Forel, 1895)
 Bajcaridris menozzii (Santschi, 1923)
 Bajcaridris theryi (Santschi, 1936)

References

External links

Formicinae
Ant genera
Hymenoptera of Africa